Lepeta is a genus of sea snails, the true limpets, marine gastropod mollusks in the family Lepetidae.

Species
Species within the genus Lepeta include:
 Lepeta caeca (Müller O.F., 1776)
 Lepeta depressa Hedley, 1916
Species brought into synonymy
 Lepeta albescens (Philippi, 1846): synonym of Iothia albescens (Philippi, 1846)
 Lepeta antarctica E. A. Smith, 1907: synonym of Iothia antarctica (E. A. Smith, 1907): synonym of Iothia emarginuloides (Philippi, 1868) (original combination)
 Lepeta caecoides Carpenter, 1864: synonym of Lepeta caeca (O. F. Müller, 1776)
 Lepeta coppingeri (E. A. Smith, 1881): synonym of Iothia emarginuloides (Philippi, 1868)
 Lepeta costulata Locard, 1898: synonym of Bathysciadium costulatum (Locard, 1898)
 Lepeta depressa Hedley, 1916: synonym of Nacella concinna (Strebel, 1908)
 Lepeta lima Dall, 1918: synonym of Limalepeta lima (Dall, 1918)
 Lepeta puntarenae Mörch, 1860: synonym of Phenacolepas puntarenae (Mörch, 1860) (original combination)
 Lepeta sagamiensis Kuroda & Habe, 1971: synonym of Sagamilepeta sagamiensis (Kuroda & Habe, 1971) (original combination)

References

 Gofas, S.; Le Renard, J.; Bouchet, P. (2001). Mollusca. in: Costello, M.J. et al. (eds), European Register of Marine Species: a check-list of the marine species in Europe and a bibliography of guides to their identification. Patrimoines Naturels. 50: 180-213. 
 Vaught, K.C.; Tucker Abbott, R.; Boss, K.J. (1989). A classification of the living Mollusca. American Malacologists: Melbourne. . XII, 195 pp

External links
 

Lepetidae